Ryan J. Fuller (born May 2, 1990) is an American professional baseball coach for the Baltimore Orioles of Major League Baseball.

Fuller graduated from Lyme-Old Lyme High School in Old Lyme, Connecticut. He enrolled at the University of Connecticut's Avery Point campus, and played for their baseball team in 2009 and 2010. He transferred to the main campus of the university and played his final two college baseball seasons with the Connecticut Huskies. He spent one season with the Arizona Diamondbacks organization, and then was a teacher and coach for Haddam-Killingworth High School from 2013 to 2019.

Fuller joined the Baltimore Orioles organization in 2019 as their minor league hitting coordinator. In 2021, he was hitting coach for the Bowie Baysox. Following the season, he was promoted to succeed Don Long as the Orioles' major league hitting coach, serving alongside Matt Borgschulte.

References

External links

Living people
1990 births
People from Old Lyme, Connecticut
UConn Huskies baseball players
Baltimore Orioles coaches
Major League Baseball hitting coaches
Arizona League Diamondbacks players